The Story of a Humble Christian (1968) is a historical play by the Italian writer Ignazio Silone, translated into English by William Weaver in 1970. It tells the story of Pope Celestine V.

Notes

1968 novels
Novels by Ignazio Silone
Historical novels
Novels set in the 13th century
Arnoldo Mondadori Editore books